Bartolomé Martí (died 1500) (called the Cardinal of Segorbe) was a Spanish Catholic bishop and cardinal.

Biography

Bartolomé Martí was born in Valencia, ca. 1430-40. Early in his career, he became the majordomo of Cardinal Roderic Llançol i de Borja (the future Pope Alexander VI).  He later became a papal chamberlain.

On September 27, 1473, he was elected Bishop of Segorbe.  John II of Aragon initially opposed his election, and a deal was not reached until 1478.  He celebrated a diocesan synod in 1479; he held a second synod in Jérica on June 8, 1485.

He went to Rome in 1487 and remained there for the rest of his life.  He initially served as Cardinal Borja's chancellor.  After Cardinal Borja became pope, he made Bishop Martí majordomo of the Apostolic Palace.  In 1494, he became Master of the Papal Chapel.  During this period, he had an active role in the ceremonies of the papal court but had no political role.

Pope Alexander VI made him a cardinal priest in the consistory of February 19, 1496.  He received the red hat and the titulus of Sant'Agata dei Goti (a deaconry raised pro illa vice to the status of titulus) on February 24, 1496.  He received the see of Bagnoregio in commendam on March 2, 1497, keeping that see until his death.  He was Camerlengo of the Sacred College of Cardinals from January 9, 1499, to 1500. In 1499, he became Bishop of Toul, a position he held until his death.

He died at his home in Campo Marzio on March 25, 1500.  He is buried in St. Peter's Basilica.

References

1500 deaths
15th-century Aragonese cardinals
Cardinals created by Pope Alexander VI
Year of birth unknown